Terellia zerovae is a species of tephritid or fruit flies in the genus Terellia of the family Tephritidae.

Distribution
Romania, Greece, Turkey, Tajikistan.

References

Tephritinae
Insects described in 1985
Diptera of Europe
Diptera of Asia